The Grand Prix de la ville de Pérenchies is a road bicycle race held annually in France. It is organized as a 1.2 event on the UCI Europe Tour.

Winners

References

UCI Europe Tour races
Cycle races in France
1977 establishments in France
Recurring sporting events established in 1977